The Stoney Creek Warriors were a Canadian junior ice hockey team based in Stoney Creek, Ontario, Canada.  They play in the Golden Horseshoe division of the Greater Ontario Junior Hockey League as well as the Golden Horseshoe Junior B Hockey League and the Niagara & District Junior C Hockey League.  As of 2013, the team was relocated to Ancaster, Ontario and renamed the Ancaster Avalanche.

History
The Warriors were first formed in 1974 as a member of the Niagara & District Junior C Hockey League.  The Warriors won four Niagara Junior C championships in their time with the league.

The team moved up to the Golden Horseshoe Junior B in 1989.  In 1993, the team changed their name to the Spirit.  In 2001, the team changed their name back to the traditional "Warriors" moniker.

The Stoney Creek Warriors for twenty years have been dealing with different circumstances to get to the point they are at right now. After 20 years they won the 2009 Golden Horseshoe Championship against the Niagara Falls Canucks.

In 2009, the Warriors made their only appearance in a Sutherland Cup final, losing to the Brantford Eagles of the Mid-Western Conference.

In the Summer of 2013, the team was sold to a group in Ancaster, Ontario and relocated.  The franchise is become known as the Ancaster Avalanche.

In April 2018, the team announced they were moving to Hamilton, taking over the Kilty B's moniker, purchased from the ownership of the Markham Royals who were previously located in Hamilton as the Red Wings and Kilty B's.

Season-by-season results

Sutherland Cup appearances
2009: Brantford Eagles defeated Stoney Creek Warriors 4-games-to-1

References

External links
Warriors Webpage

Golden Horseshoe Junior B Hockey League teams